9931 Herbhauptman, provisional designation , is a stony Nysian asteroid from the inner regions of the asteroid belt, approximately  in diameter. It was discovered on 18 April 1985, by Czech astronomer Antonín Mrkos at the Kleť Observatory in former Czechoslovakia. The S-type asteroid has a rotation period of 4.44 hours. It was named after American mathematician and Nobel laureate Herbert A. Hauptman.

Orbit and classification 

Herbhauptman is member of the Nysa family, one of the largest asteroid families.

It orbits the Sun in the inner main-belt at a distance of 2.0–2.8 AU once every 3 years and 8 months (1,340 days; semi-major axis of 2.38 AU). Its orbit has an eccentricity of 0.18 and an inclination of 2° with respect to the ecliptic.

Physical characteristics 

Herbhauptman has been characterized as a stony S-type asteroid by Pan-STARRS survey.

Rotation period 

In 2014, two rotational lightcurves of Herbhauptman have been obtained from photometric observations in the R-band by astronomers at the Palomar Transient Factory in California. Lightcurve analysis gave a rotation period of 4.438 and 4.44 hours with a brightness amplitude of 0.15 and 0.21 magnitude, respectively.

Diameter and albedo 

According to the survey carried out by the NEOWISE mission of NASA's Wide-field Infrared Survey Explorer, Herbhauptman measures 5.179 kilometers in diameter and its surface has an albedo of 0.239, while the Collaborative Asteroid Lightcurve Link assumes a standard albedo for a stony asteroid of 0.20 and calculates a diameter of 4.54 kilometers based on an absolute magnitude of 14.08.

Naming 

This minor planet was named after American mathematician Herbert A. Hauptman (1917–2011), who was awarded with the Nobel Prize in Chemistry for developing direct methods for the determination of crystal structures in 1985. The official naming citation was published by the Minor Planet Center on 28 September 2004.

References

External links 
 Asteroid Lightcurve Database (LCDB), query form (info )
 Dictionary of Minor Planet Names, Google books
 Discovery Circumstances: Numbered Minor Planets (5001)-(10000) – Minor Planet Center
 
 

009931
Discoveries by Antonín Mrkos
Named minor planets
19850418